Saint Alphonsus may refer to the following Roman Catholic saints:
Alphonsus Liguori, founder of the Redemptorists and devotional writer 
Alphonsus Rodriguez, Spanish-born widower, Jesuit lay brother

See also 
 St. Alphonsus Church (disambiguation)